Gary Ingram (November 29, 1933 – November 30, 2017) was an American politician who served in the Idaho House of Representatives from 1973 to 1980, and again in 2012.

Ingram moved to Coeur d'Alene, Idaho from St. Paul, Minnesota in 1961. He was first elected to the Idaho House of Representatives in 1973. The next year, Ingram authored the Open Meetings Law. He won reelection three times and left office in 1980. Ingram served a portion of representative Kathleen Sims' term in 2012. He died of cancer on November 30, 2017, at the age of 84.

References

1933 births
2017 deaths
Republican Party members of the Idaho House of Representatives
People from Coeur d'Alene, Idaho
Politicians from Saint Paul, Minnesota